Hector Munro (24 October 1920 – 6 January 2014) was an English cricketer. He played one first-class match for Oxford University Cricket Club in 1947.

See also
 List of Oxford University Cricket Club players

References

External links
 
 

1920 births
2014 deaths
English cricketers
Oxford University cricketers
Cricketers from Kolkata
Alumni of Trinity College, Oxford